Metagonimus miyatai is a species of a trematode, or fluke worm, in the family Heterophyidae.

It is a human parasite causing metagonimiasis.

Distribution
This species occurs in Japan and Korea.

Life cycle
The first intermediate hosts of Metagonimus miyatai include freshwater snails Semisulcospira libertina, Semisulcospira dolorosa, and Koreoleptoxis globus.

The second intermediate host include freshwater fish: Phoxinus lagowskii steindachneri, Zacco platypus, Nipponocypris temminckii, Plecoglossus altivelis, Tribolodon hakonensis, and Tribolodon brandtii, Opsariichthys bidens.

Natural definitive hosts are: dogs, red fox Vulpes vulpes japonica, Japanese raccoon dog Nyctereutes procyonoides viverrinus, black-eared kite Milvus migrans lineatus, and humans.

Experimental definitive hosts are: mice, rats, hamsters, and dogs.

References

External links

 

Heterophyidae
Animals described in 1997